Lykens is an unincorporated community in Lykens Township, Crawford County, Ohio, United States.

History
Lykens was laid out in 1870.

Notable people
Lorenzo D. Gasser, U.S. Army major general, born in Lykens

References

Populated places in Crawford County, Ohio